The  is a Shintō shrine in the city of Iwanuma in Miyagi Prefecture, Japan. It is considered one of the three main shrines dedicated to the kami Inari, and claims to be the second-oldest Inari shrine in Japan. It was also referred to as the 

Inari's traditional festival day is the first horse day (the sixth day) of the second month of the lunisolar calendar; in recent years, the shrine has celebrated the event on a Sunday in February or early March.  This festival is estimated to draw a quarter-million attendees.

The shrine is also home to a horsemanship museum.

Enshrined kami
There are also several smaller subsidiary shrines within the shrine grounds.

History
The Takekoma Inari Shrine was established in 842 AD, reputedly by Ono no Takamura, the kokushi of Ōshū Province, as a branch of the famous Fushimi Inari Shrine south of Kyoto. The shrine is mentioned by the Heian period poet Nōin during the reign of Emperor Go-Reizei (1045-1068) and during the Sengoku period was awarded an estate by local warlord Date Tanemune. It continued to be supported by the Date clan of Sendai Domain through the end of the Edo period. Following the start of State Shinto in the Meiji period, the shrine was ranked as a Prefectural Shrine under the Modern system of ranked Shinto Shrines.

Notable structures
The Honden of the shrine was a structure built by the 5th daimyō of Sendai Domain, Date Yoshimura, but burned down in a fire on November 21, 1990. It was rebuilt in 1994. Currently, the oldest structure in the shrine is the Zuishinmon two-story gate tower. It was built in 1812 and is a registered Important Cultural Property of Iwanuma City.

See also
 List of Shinto shrines
 Modern system of ranked Shinto Shrines

References
 Smyers, Karen Ann. (1999). The Fox and the Jewel: Shared and Private Meanings in Contemporary Japanese Inari Worship. Honolulu: University of Hawaii Press. ; ;  OCLC 39523475
 Plutschow, Herbe. Matsuri: The Festivals of Japan. RoutledgeCurzon (1996) 
 Ponsonby-Fane, Richard Arthur Brabazon. (1962).   Studies in Shinto and Shrines. Kyoto: Ponsonby Memorial Society. OCLC 3994492

External links
 Official site of the shrine

Notes

Shinto shrines in Miyagi Prefecture
Iwanuma, Miyagi
Inari shrines
Beppyo shrines